"Burlesque" is a song and single written by Roger Chapman and John Whitney and performed by British group, Family.

It was first released in 1972. It entered the UK singles chart in September,  reaching number 13 and stayed for twelve  weeks on the chart.

References 

1972 songs
Songs written by Roger Chapman
Songs written by John "Charlie" Whitney
Reprise Records singles
Family (band) songs